The Capture of Torrijos Airport was a U.S military operation during the invasion of Panama. The goal of this operation was to capture the Panamanian air force, headquartered at the airport, and to close the airport to traffic coming into Panama.

The capture of Torrijos Airport was executed by the US Army rangers of 75th Ranger Regiment.

Background

The US had developed a three-stage plan to capture Torrijos Airport to the mission: to isolate Objective Bear (the main terminal), to eliminate enemy resistance, and to prevent the Panama Defense Force (PDF) from interfering with Operation Just Cause. 

The Company C could rely on fire support consisted of an AC-130 "Spectre" gunship and AH-6 attack helicopters. The American plan called for the AC-130 was to clear three .50-caliber machine gun positions and a ZPU-4 anti-aircraft position at the airport, while the AH-6s neutralised the PDF guard tower. 

Initially, U.S. intelligence indicated that there were very few people in the main terminal at H-Hour. However, two international flights had just landed at the airport, which was still fully operational. As a result of this, there were actually 398 civilians in the airport rather than the few dozen that the Americans had expected to find. In addition, to this intelligence failure the PDF's 2nd Company was on alert and was patrolling in and around the airport terminal buildings.

Aftermath
On the morning of 20 December 1989, at approximately 7am, the Ranger company was able to linked up with units from the 82nd Airborne Division. The prisoners, detainees, and confiscated documents and weapons were turned over to the military police company commander of the 82nd Airborne Division. 

During the course of the operation to capture the airport only 2 rangers were wounded. Where as 5 PDF soldiers were killed and 21 were captured.

References 

20th-century military history of the United States
Military history of Panama
Torrijos Airport
Torrijos Airport 
United States Army Rangers
Airborne operations
December 1989 events in North America
United States invasion of Panama